= 1994 foreign exchange system reform in China =

1994 foreign exchange system reform in China was a reform of the system of goods import and export, technology import and export and international service trade implemented by China in 1994. The core and foundation of the reform was the unification of exchange rates.

== History ==
On 11 January 1994, the State Council made the "Decision on Further Deepening the Reform of the Foreign Trade System", proposing to establish an operating mechanism that adapts to the common rules of international economics. On 5 May 1994, the Foreign Trade Law of the People's Republic of China was reviewed and adopted at the seventh meeting of the Standing Committee of the Eighth National People's Congress, which made unified provisions on a series of issues and regulations such as the total import and export volume of foreign trade enterprises, export proceeds, and export tax rebate system.
